St. Joseph Parish was originally built to serve Polish immigrants in Claremont, New Hampshire, United States. It was founded in 1922, it is one of the Polish-American Roman Catholic parishes in New England in the Diocese of Manchester.

Bibliography 
 
 The Official Catholic Directory in USA

References

External links 
 http://www.catholicnh.org/

Churches in the Roman Catholic Diocese of Manchester
Claremont
Roman Catholic parishes and churches in New Hampshire
Churches in Sullivan County, New Hampshire
Buildings and structures in Claremont, New Hampshire